This article is about the demographic features of the population of Malta, including population density, ethnicity, religious affiliations and other aspects of the population.

Characteristics

Malta is the most densely populated country in the EU and one of the most densely populated countries in the world, with about 1,265 inhabitants per square kilometre (3,000 per square mile). This compares with about 32 per square kilometre (85 per square mile) for the United States. A census (held every 10 years) was held in November 2005.

Inhabited since prehistoric times, Malta was first colonized by Sicilians. Subsequently, Phoenicians, Romans, Byzantines, Arabs in 870 AD who may have completely depopulated the islands but in 1224 were themselves expelled from Malta, Normans, Sicilians, Spanish, French and the British have influenced Maltese life and culture to varying degrees.

Roman Catholicism is established by law as the religion of Malta with 98%; however, full liberty of conscience and freedom of worship is guaranteed, and a number of faiths have places of worship on the island (rather small groups, a combined total of 2% of the people are Protestants, Eastern Orthodox, Muslims and Jews).

Malta has two official languages--Maltese (a Semitic language derived from Siculo-Arabic and heavily influenced by Sicilian and Italian), and English. Both languages are compulsory subjects in Maltese primary and secondary schools. A large portion of the population is also fluent in Italian, which was, until 1936, the national language of Malta. The literacy rate has reached 93%, compared to 63% in 1946. Schooling is compulsory until age 16.

Age distribution
Since 2000, the shift in the age composition towards an older population continued to materialise. In fact, the average age of the Maltese population increased from 38.5 in 2005 to 40.5 in 2011. This resulted from the increase in the number of persons aged 55 and over, together with a decrease in the number of persons under 25 years of age. The average in Gozo and Comino (41.6 years) was higher than that observed for Malta.
Persons aged 65 and over more represent 16.3% of the total population in 2011, compared to 13.7% in 2005. In contrast, persons aged 14 and under make up 14.8% of the population in 2011, compared to 17.2% in 2005.

Migrant background and foreign nationality 
Foreign nationals in Malta

As of 2016 and 2017, the numbers of selected groups of resident foreign nationals (non-naturalized residents) in Malta were as follows:

This list does not include foreign nationals who acquired Maltese nationality and foreign nationals without resident status.

Emigration 

Malta has long been a country of emigration, with big Maltese communities in English-speaking countries abroad.
Mass emigration picked up in the 19th century, reaching its peak in the decades after World War II.

In the nineteenth century, most migration from Malta was to North Africa and the Middle East (particularly Algeria, Tunisia and Egypt), although rates of return migration to Malta were high. Nonetheless, Maltese communities formed in these regions. By 1900, for example, British consular estimates suggest that there were 15,326 Maltese in Tunisia.
There is little trace left of the Maltese communities in North Africa, most of them having been displaced, after the rise of independence movements, to places like Marseille, the United Kingdom or Australia.

After World War II, Malta's Emigration Department would assist emigrants with the cost of their travel. Between 1948 and 1967, 30 per cent of the population emigrated. Between 1946 and the late 1970s, over 140,000 people left Malta on the assisted passage scheme, with 57.6 per cent migrating to Australia, 22 per cent to the UK, 13 per cent to Canada and 7 per cent to the United States. (See also Maltese Australians; Maltese people in the United Kingdom)

46,998 Maltese-born residents were recorded by the 2001 Australian Census, 30,178 by the 2001 UK Census, 9,525 by the 2001 Canadian Census and 9,080 by the 2000 United States Census.

Emigration dropped dramatically after the mid-1970s and has since ceased to be a social phenomenon of significance. However, since Malta joined the EU in 2004 expatriate communities emerged in a number of European countries particularly in Belgium and Luxembourg. At the same time, Malta is becoming more and more attractive for communities of immigrants, both from Western and Northern Europe (Italians, British) and from Eastern Europe (Serbians).

Immigration 

Most of the foreign community in Malta, predominantly active or retired British nationals and their dependents, is centred on Sliema and surrounding modern suburbs. Other smaller foreign groups include Italians, French, and Lebanese, many of whom have assimilated into the Maltese nation over the decades.

Since the late 20th century, Malta has become a transit country for migration routes from Africa towards Europe.
As a member of the European Union and of the Schengen agreement, Malta is bound by the Dublin Regulation to process all claims for asylum by those asylum seekers that enter EU territory for the first time in Malta.

Irregular migrants (formal Maltese: immigranti irregolari, informal: klandestini) who land in Malta are subject to a compulsory detention policy, being held in several camps organised by the Armed Forces of Malta (AFM), including those near Ħal Far and Ħal Safi. The compulsory detention policy has been denounced by several NGOs, and in July 2010, the European Court of Human Rights found that Malta's detention of migrants was arbitrary, lacking in adequate procedures to challenge detention, and in breach of its obligations under the European Convention on Human Rights.

Very few migrants arrived in Malta in 2015, despite the fact that the rest Europe was experiencing a migrant crisis. Most migrants who were rescued between Libya and Malta were taken to Italy, and some refused to be brought to Malta.

CIA World Factbook demographic statistics 

The following demographic statistics are from the CIA World Factbook, unless otherwise indicated.

Largest cities:
Birkirkara
Mosta
Qormi
Żabbar
San Pawl il-Baħar
Sliema
San Ġwann
Rabat
Żejtun
Naxxar

Life expectancy at birth:
total population:
79.01 years
male:
76.83 years
female:
81.31 years (2006 est.)

Total fertility rate:
1.42 children born/woman (2015 est.)

State religion:
Roman Catholic Church in Malta 88.6% (2016 est.)

Languages:
Maltese (official de facto), English (official de jure), Italian (widely understood)

Vital statistics
Statistics from United Nations and National Statistics Office Malta

Note: Crude migration change (per 1000) is a trend analysis, an extrapolation based average population change (current year minus previous) minus natural change of the current year (see table vital statistics). As average population is an estimate of the population in the middle of the year and not end of the year.

Census per locality, 1901-2011 

Notes:
  Gżira shown as a separate locality since 1948.
  New locality of Msieraħ (San Ġwann) constituted from parts of Birkirkara and St Julian's and is shown as separate locality in 1967.
  New locality of Fgura constituted from parts of Paola, Ħal Tarxien and Ħaż‐Żabbar in 1967.
  Marsaskala shown as a separate locality since 1957.
  New locality of Munxar constituted from parts of Ta' Sannat and Fontana till 1957.
  New locality of Fontana shown as separate locality till 1967.
  Gwardamangia formed part of Ħamrun in 1967.
  Tal‐Pietà formed part of Msida in 1967.
  Santa Luċija formed part of Ħal Tarxien and Paola till 1967.
  Ta' Xbiex formed part of Msida and Gżira till 1967.
  Pembroke formed part of St Julian's till 1985.
  Swieqi formed part of St Julian's till 1985.
  Xgħajra formed part of Ħaż‐Żabbar till 1985.
  Iklin formed part of Ħal Lija, Birkirkara, Naxxar and San Ġwann till 1985.
  Mtarfa formed part of Rabat till 1995.
  The boundaries of some localities were changed between 1995 and 2005.
Source:

See also 

Malta
Culture of Malta
Maltese people
Aging of Europe

References